Kim Joo-Mi (Korean 김주미 ) (born 16 July 1984), also known as Joo Mi Kim, is a South Korean professional golfer.

Kim was born in Seoul, South Korea. She attended Choo Ang University and turned professional in 2002.

Kim won two tournaments on the LPGA of Korea Tour in 2003 and a third in 2004. In the latter year she finished 12th at the LPGA Final Qualifying Tournament to earn a place on the U.S.-based LPGA Tour in 2005. Her first win on the LPGA Tour came at the first official money event of the 2006 season, the SBS Open at Turtle Bay.

Professional wins

LPGA of Korea Tour wins (3)
2003 Hansol Ladies Open, Woori Jeung Kwan Classic
2004 Hansol Ladies Open

LPGA Tour wins (1)

LPGA Tour playoff record (1–0)

Team appearances
Amateur
Espirito Santo Trophy (representing South Korea): 2000, 2002

Professional
Lexus Cup (representing Asia team): 2006 (winners)

South Korean female golfers
LPGA Tour golfers
LPGA of Korea Tour golfers
Asian Games medalists in golf
Asian Games gold medalists for South Korea
Asian Games silver medalists for South Korea
Golfers at the 2002 Asian Games
Medalists at the 2002 Asian Games
Golfers from Seoul
1984 births
Living people